A referendum was held in Ontario, Canada on April 18, 1921, concerning a ban on the importation of alcoholic beverages into the province. The referendum passed, and an importation ban was implemented.

Referendum question 
Shall the importation and the bringing of intoxicating liquors into the province be forbidden?

History 
Though the Judicial Committee of the Privy Council had ruled in 1896 that provinces do not have the authority to prohibit the importation of alcohol, the Canada Temperance Act allowed the federal government to enact a prohibition if a majority was reached in a referendum. Similar referendums had previously been undertaken in Alberta, Manitoba, Saskatchewan and Nova Scotia in 1920, and in New Brunswick and Prince Edward Island in 1921. 

Initially, the Ontario referendum was to be held on the same day as those in Alberta, Manitoba, Saskatchewan and Nova Scotia.  Concerns about the voter list eventually led to its rescheduling.

Results 

Total prohibition, or "bone-dry" prohibition, was brought into effect in Ontario. Though the provincial government was bound by the results, the enactment of an importation ban would be delayed.

See also
 Prohibition in Canada
 Canada Temperance Act
 1894 Ontario prohibition plebiscite
 1902 Ontario prohibition referendum
 1919 Ontario prohibition referendum
 1924 Ontario prohibition referendum

References

Bibliography

1921 in Canada
1921 referendums
Ontario prohibition referendums
April 1921 events
1921 in Ontario